Michael Remington (16 December 1757 – January 1826) was an English first-class cricketer.

Born at Boughton Monchelsea, Remington made his debut in first-class cricket for Kent against Hampshire at Alresford in 1781, with Remington also playing in a first-class match for East Kent against West Kent in the same season. His next appearance in first-class cricket came in 1787, when he played for Hornchurch against a combined White Conduit Club and Moulsey Hurst cricket team at Hornchurch. Two weeks after this match he appeared for Essex against Middlesex at Lord's Old Ground, with Remington following this up with two further first-class appearances in 1787; one for the White Conduit Club against Middlesex, and a second for Hornchurch against White Conduit Club and Moulsey Hurst. He made a final first-class appearance in 1791 for Hornchurch against the Marylebone Cricket Club. Playing a total of seven first-class matches, Remington scored 133 runs with a high score of 28, while with the ball he took a single wicket.

He died at Rochester in January 1826. His brothers, Benjamin and Thomas, both played first-class cricket.

References

External links

1757 births
1826 deaths
People from Boughton Monchelsea
English cricketers
Kent cricketers
East Kent cricketers
Hornchurch Cricket Club cricketers
Essex cricketers
White Conduit Club cricketers